Nipepe District is a district of Niassa Province in north-western Mozambique. The principal town is 
Nipepe.

Further reading
District profile (PDF)

Districts in Niassa Province